Anauxesis kenyensis is a species of beetle in the family Cerambycidae. It was described by Stephan von Breuning (entomologist) in 1938.

References

Agapanthiini
Beetles described in 1938